Amédée Isola (10 July 1898 – 15 January 1991) was a French runner. He competed in the 3000 m steeplechase at the 1924 Summer Olympics and finished eighth. He was also a non-scoring member of the winning French team at the 1922 International Cross Country Championships.

References

1898 births
1991 deaths
French male middle-distance runners
French male steeplechase runners
Athletes (track and field) at the 1924 Summer Olympics
Olympic athletes of France